Farrukh Nurliboev (born 6 January 1991) is a footballer from Uzbekistan currently playing for Regar-TadAZ in Tajikistan as a defender.

References

External links 
 

Living people
1991 births
Association football defenders
Uzbekistani footballers
Uzbekistan international footballers
2011 AFC Asian Cup players